Vsevolod Alexandrovich Rozhdestvensky (10 April 1895 in Tsarskoye Selo – 31 August 1977 in Leningrad) was a Russian/Soviet poet.

Rozhdestvensky served for four years as a war correspondent during World War II. He served on the Leningrad Front, Volkhov Front, and the Karelia Front, as a correspondent for military newspapers. He wrote poetry and a volume of memoirs.  He also provided the libretto for Yuri Shaporin's opera The Decembrists.

References

1895 births
1977 deaths
People from Pushkin, Saint Petersburg
People from Tsarskoselsky Uyezd
Russian male poets
Soviet poets
Soviet male writers
20th-century Russian male writers
Russian memoirists
Russian opera librettists
Russian male dramatists and playwrights
20th-century dramatists and playwrights
War correspondents of World War II
20th-century memoirists